Since independence, Indonesian foreign relations have adhered to a "free and active" foreign policy, seeking to play a role in regional affairs commensurate with its size and location but avoiding involvement in conflicts among major powers. During the Presidency of Sukarno, Indonesia's Foreign Relations were marked by engagement with other newly independent nations in Asia and Africa, as exemplified by the Bandung Conference, the subsequent foundation of the Non-Aligned Movement and a confrontational attitude towards Western powers, justified by a belief in the CONEFO and opposition to what Sukarno termed as NEKOLIM (Neocolonialism and Imperialism).

After a US-backed ouster of Sukarno and left-wing elements in 1965, Indonesian foreign policy underwent a major shift under the "New Order" government, as President Suharto moved away from the stridently anti-Western, anti-American posturing that characterised the latter part of the Sukarno era. Following Suharto's ouster in 1998, Indonesia's government has preserved the broad outlines of Suharto's independent, moderate foreign policy. Preoccupation with domestic problems has not prevented successive presidents from travelling abroad.

Indonesia's relations with the international community were strained as a result of its invasion of neighbouring East Timor in December 1975, the subsequent annexation and occupation, the independence referendum in 1999, and the resulting violence afterwards. As one of the founding members of Association of Southeast Asian Nations (ASEAN), established in 1967, and also as the largest country in Southeast Asia, Indonesia has put ASEAN as the cornerstone of its foreign policy and outlook. After the transformation from Suharto's regime to a relatively open and democratic country in the 21st century, Indonesia today exercises its influence to promote co-operation, development, democracy, security, peace and stability in the region through its leadership in ASEAN.

Indonesia managed to play a role as a peacemaker in the Cambodia-Thailand conflict over the Preah Vihear temple. Indonesia and other ASEAN member countries collectively have also played a role in encouraging the government of Myanmar to open up its political system and introduce other reforms more quickly.

Given its geographic and demographic size, rising capabilities and diplomatic initiatives, scholars have classified Indonesia as one of Asia-Pacific's middle powers.

Significant international memberships

ASEAN 

A cornerstone of Indonesia's contemporary foreign policy is its participation in the Association of Southeast Asian Nations (ASEAN), of which it was a founding member in 1967 with Thailand, Malaysia, Singapore, and the Philippines. Since then, Brunei, Vietnam, Laos, Burma, and Cambodia also have joined ASEAN. While organised to promote shared economic, social, and cultural goals, ASEAN acquired a security dimension after Vietnam's liberation of Cambodia in 1979; this aspect of ASEAN expanded with the establishment of the ASEAN Regional Forum in 1994, which comprises 22 countries, including the US.

Indonesian national capital Jakarta is also the seat of ASEAN Secretariat, located at Jalan Sisingamangaraja No.70A, Kebayoran Baru, South Jakarta. Other than serving their diplomatic missions for Indonesia, numbers of foreign embassies and diplomatic mission in Jakarta are also accredited to ASEAN. ASEAN Headquarter has led to the prominence of Jakarta as a diplomatic hub in Southeast Asia.

In the late 1990s to early 2000s, Indonesia's continued domestic troubles have distracted it from ASEAN matters and consequently lessened its influence within the organisation. However, after the political and economic transformation, from the turmoil of 1998 Reformasi to the relatively open and democratic civil society with rapid economic growth in the 2010s, Indonesia returned to the region's diplomatic stage by assuming its leadership role in ASEAN in 2011. Indonesia is viewed to have weight, international legitimacy and global appeal to draw support and attention from around the world to ASEAN. Indonesia believes that ASEAN can contribute positively to the international community, by promoting economic development and co-operation, improving security, peace, the stability of ASEAN, and making the Southeast Asia region far from conflicts.

Indonesia's bilateral relations with three neighbouring ASEAN members — Malaysia, Singapore, and Vietnam — are not without challenges. If not appropriately managed, it would result in mutual mistrust and suspicion, thus hindering bilateral and regional co-operation. In the era of rising Indonesia, which might assert its leadership role within ASEAN, the problem could become more significant. Nevertheless, the rise of Indonesia should be regarded in the sense of optimism. First, although Indonesia is likely to become assertive, the general tone of its foreign policy is mainly liberal and accommodating. The consolidation of the Indonesian democratic government played a key role and influence in ASEAN. The second, institutional web of ASEAN will sustain engagements and regular meetings between regional elites, thus deepening their mutual understanding and personal connections.

Non-Aligned Movement (NAM) 
Indonesia also was one of the founders of NAM and has taken moderate positions in its councils. As NAM Chairman in 1992–95, it led NAM positions away from the rhetoric of North-South confrontation, advocating the broadening of North-South co-operation instead  in the area of development. Indonesia continues to be a prominent, and generally helpful, leader of the Non-Aligned Movement.

Organization of Islamic Cooperation (OIC) 
Indonesia has the world's largest Muslim population and is a member of OIC. It carefully considers the interests of Islamic solidarity in its foreign policy decisions but generally has been an influence for moderation in the OIC.

APEC 
Indonesia has been a strong supporter of the Asia-Pacific Economic Cooperation (APEC) forum. Mainly through the efforts of President Suharto at the 1994 meeting in Indonesia, APEC members agreed to implement free trade in the region by 2010 for industrialised economies and 2020 for developing economies. As the largest economy in Southeast Asia, Indonesia also belongs to other economic groupings such as G20 and Developing 8 Countries (D-8).

G20 major economies 
In 2008, Indonesia was admitted as a member of the G20, as the only ASEAN member state in the group. Through its membership in the global economic powerhouse that accounted of 85% of the global economy, Indonesia is keen to position itself as a mouthpiece for ASEAN countries, and as a representative of the developing world within the G20. Bali, Indonesia had played host to the 2022 G20 Summit.

IGGI and CGI 
After 1966, Indonesia welcomed and maintained close relations with the international donor community, particularly the United States, western Europe, Australia, and Japan, through the meetings of the Inter-Governmental Group on Indonesia (IGGI) and its successor, the Consultative Group on Indonesia (CGI), which coordinated substantial foreign economic assistance. Problems in Timor and Indonesia's reluctance to implement economic reform at times complicated Indonesia's relationship with donors.  In 1992 the IGGI aid coordination group ceased to meet and the coordination activities were transferred to meetings arranged by the World Bank through the CGI.  The CGI, in turn, ceased activities in 2007 when the Indonesian government suggested that an internationally-organised aid coordination program was no longer needed.

International disputes 
Indonesia has numerous outlying and remote islands, some of which are inhabited by numerous pirate groups that regularly attack ships in the Strait of Malacca in the north, and illegal fishing crews known for penetrating Australian and Filipino waters. While Indonesian waters itself is the target of many illegal fishing activities by numerous foreign vessels.

Indonesia has some present and historic territorial disputes with neighboring nations, such as:
 Ambalat Block in dispute with Malaysia (ongoing, overlapping EEZ line drawn by both countries)
 Ashmore and Cartier Islands in dispute with Australia (ongoing, the islands known by Indonesians as Pulau Pasir)
 Fatu Sinai Island (Pulau Batek) formerly disputed with East Timor (settled, East Timor ceded the island to Indonesia in August 2004)
 Miangas (Las Palmas) formerly disputed with Philippine Islands (settled, part of Indonesia's territory as of Island of Palmas Case)
 Northern waters off Natuna Islands in dispute with China and Taiwan (ongoing; overlapping with Chinese Nine-Dash Line claim)
 Sipadan and Ligitan Islands formerly disputed with Malaysia (settled, part of Malaysia's territory per International Court of Justice's decision in 2002)

Bilateral relations

Africa

Americas

Asia

Europe

Oceania

International organisation participation

See also 

Indonesia–United States relations
Australia–Indonesia relations
Indonesia–Russia relations
China–Indonesia relations
Indonesia–Serbia relations
European Union-Indonesia relations
List of diplomatic missions in Indonesia
List of diplomatic missions of Indonesia
List of diplomatic missions in Jakarta
List of Indonesian Ambassadors to Australia
List of Indonesian Ambassadors to the United Kingdom

Notes

Further reading 
 
 Gardner, Paul F., Shared Hopes, Separate Fears: Fifty Years of U.S.-Indonesia Relations, Boulder, Colorado: Westview Press (1997).
 He, Kai. "Indonesia's foreign policy after Soeharto: international pressure, democratization, and policy change." International Relations of the Asia-Pacific 8.1 (2007): 47-72.   online
 Leifer, Michael. Indonesia's Foreign Policy (1983)
 Ricklefs, M. C. A History of Modern Indonesia since c.1200 (2001 0
 Shekhar,  Vibhanshu. Indonesia’s Foreign Policy and Grand Strategy in the 21st Century: Rise of an Indo-Pacific Power (2018)
 Sukma, Rizal. "The evolution of Indonesia's foreign policy: an Indonesian view." Asian Survey 35.3 (1995): 304-315. online
 Weinstein, Franklin B.  Indonesia Abandons Confrontation: An Inquiry Into the Functions of Indonesian Foreign Policy'' (2009)

External links 
Politics, Public Opinion, and the U.S.-Indonesian Comprehensive Partnership (NBR Special Report, December 2010)